Alpheus Lee Ellis (February 5, 1906 – October 29, 1995) was an American banker and philanthropist. 

Ellis was born in Elba, Alabama. He went to college in 1923 for 3 years at Alabama Polytechnic Institute, which is now Auburn University. He moved to Florida at the age of 19 where he started his career in banking. He married Helen Lansden on April 11th, 1936.

Ellis was a banker for more than 60 years. He was the President & founder of Ellis Bank & Trust Company of Florida.

He was a former president of the Florida Bankers Association and a director of the Federal Reserve Bank of Atlanta.

He developed his chain of banks to 75 branches and assets of $1.6-billion when he sold out to NCNB of Charlotte, N.C in 1983. Ellis was the second-largest stockholder in NationsBank Corporation after completing the bank merger.

In 1987, NCNB National Bank donated $500,000 to the Children's Home Society of Florida, in honor of Mr. Ellis.
The organization honored him in 1995, 50 years after he and his wife adopted their daughter Carol from the agency, for his support of the program.

Ellis died from a heart attack while recovering from surgery on October 29, 1995 at the age of 89.

Ellis's daughter, Carol E. Martin died on April 7, 2021 at the age of 76, like her father she was a philanthropist and donated to  numerous charities during her lifetime.

References 

 
 
 
 
 

American bankers
American philanthropists

1906 births
1995 deaths